is a Japanese politician of the Liberal Democratic Party, a member of the House of Representatives in the Diet (national legislature). A native of Tokyo and graduate of Keio University, he was elected to the House of Representatives for the first time in 2005.  He represents the 4th District of Chiba prefecture, which includes the city of Funabashi.

References 
 

Members of the House of Representatives (Japan)
Koizumi Children
Sony people
Keio University alumni
Politicians from Tokyo
1968 births
Living people
Liberal Democratic Party (Japan) politicians